Navajo Dolls describe a style of clothing that Navajo women copied from east coast American society in the 1860s. Women of that era wore full dresses made out of satin. President Lincoln's wife and friends wore full dresses made of satin. Navajo women copied the patterns but substituted velvet for the satin and made buttons out of nickels and dimes. These stylish skirts are still fashionable today, for Navajos and non-Navajos alike.

References
 Larson, Jack Lenor. Folk Art from the Global Village. Santa Fe, NM: Museum of New Mexico Press, 1995.

1860s fashion
Navajo culture
Native American clothing
Dresses